The 2014–15 Super League Greece was the 79th season of the highest tier in league of Greek football and the ninth under its current title. The season began on 23 August and ended on 11 May 2015. Olympiacos won their 42nd Greek title. The league comprises sixteen teams from the 2013–14 season and two promoted from the 2013–14 Football League.

Teams
Two teams were relegated from the 2013–14 season. Apollon Smyrnis and Aris will play in Football League for the 2014–15 season.

Two teams were promoted from the 2013–14 Football League, champions Niki Volos and Kerkyra. Niki Volos were promoted back to the top level for the first time in 48 years.

Stadia and locations

Personnel and kits
Note: Flags indicate national team as has been defined under FIFA eligibility rules. Players and Managers may hold more than one non-FIFA nationality.

Managerial changes

Regular season

League table

Results

Positions by round
The table lists the positions of teams after each week of matches. In order to preserve chronological evolvements, any postponed matches are not included in the round at which they were originally scheduled, but added to the full round they were played immediately afterwards.

Play-offs
In the play-off for Champions League, the four qualified teams play each other in a home and away round robin. However, they do not all start with 0 points. Instead, a weighting system applies to the teams' standing at the start of the play-off mini-league. The team finishing fifth in the Super League will start the play-off with 0 points. The fifth placed team's end of season tally of points is subtracted from the sum of the points that other teams have. This number is then divided by five.

Season statistics
Updated to games played on 10 May 2015

Top scorers

Top assists

Best goal and MVP awards winners

Awards

Annual awards
Annual awards were announced on 1 February 2016.

Player of the Year
The Player of the Year awarded to  Alejandro Domínguez (Olympiacos)

Foreign Player of the Year
The Foreign Player of the Year awarded to  Alejandro Domínguez (Olympiacos)

Top goalscorer of the Year
The Top goalscorer of the Year awarded to  Jerónimo Barrales (Asteras Tripolis)

Greek Player of the Year
The Greek Player of the Year awarded to  Nikos Kaltsas (Veria)

Manager of the Year

The Manager of the Year awarded to  Giannis Petrakis (PAS Giannina)

Breakthrough of the Year

The Breakthrough of the Year awarded to  Charis Charisis (PAS Giannina)

Team of the Year 
 
Goalkeeper:
 Markos Vellidis (PAS Giannina)
Defence:
 Omar Elabdellaoui (Olympiacos), Dimitrios Siovas (Olympiacos),  Stathis Tavlaridis (Atromitos),  Arthur Masuaku (Olympiacos)
Midfield:
 Cleyton (Xanthi),  Carlos Zeca (Panathinaikos),   Alejandro Domínguez (Olympiacos),  Nicolas Martínez (Panetolikos) 
Attack:
 Nikos Karelis (Panathinaikos),  Jerónimo Barrales (Asteras Tripolis)

Tickets
''Updated to games played on 10 May 2015, as published on superleaguegreece.net. Games are counted without games played behind closed gates.

References

External links
Official website 

Greece
1
2014-15